The following is a comprehensive list for the discography of Demon Hunter, an American Christian metal band. The band's discography consists of 11 studio albums, 2 live albums, 2 compilation album, 34 singles and 16 music videos.

Studio albums

Live albums

Compilations 

  Double Take: Demon Hunter, 2007
  Death, a Destination, 2011
  Songs of Death and Resurrection, 2021

Singles

Other charted songs

Music videos

Non-album tracks 

 This is Solid State Vol. 3, "Through the Black (Demo)" 2002 
 Blessed Resistance Fan Club Exclusive, "Storm the Gates of Hell (Demo)" 2008 
 X 2010, "Collapsing (Radio Edit)" 2010 
 Happy Christmas Volume 5, "The Wind" 2010 
 Blessed Resistance Fan Club Exclusive, "Collapsing (OG Version)" 2012

Notes

References

Heavy metal group discographies
Discographies of American artists